Pseudotrapelus chlodnickii is a species of Agama native to Sudan and Libya.

References 

Reptiles described in 2015
chlodnickii
Taxa named by Daniel Andreevich Melnikov
Taxa named by Roman A. Nazarov
Taxa named by Natalia B. Ananjeva